HMS Agamemnon was a Royal Navy 91-gun battleship ordered by the Admiralty in 1849, in response to the perceived threat from France by their possession of ships of the Napoléon class.

Characteristics 
She was the first British battleship to be designed and built from the keel up with installed steam power, although, due to the inefficiency of steam engines of the period, it was expected that she would spend much of her time travelling under sail power. She therefore carried a full square rig on three masts, in common with large sailing warships of the period. She was named after Agamemnon, the King of Mycenae, who led the Greek forces in the Trojan War.

She carried an armament of muzzle loading smooth-bore cannon, typical of warships at this time, on two decks. She was completed in 1852.

Service 

Agamemnon was attached to the Mediterranean Fleet and served in the Crimean War as flagship of Rear-Admiral Sir Edmund Lyons. She participated in the bombardment of Sevastopol on 17 October 1854. During the Great Storm of 1854, she was driven ashore on the Russian coast of the Black Sea. Agamemnon participated in the shelling of Fort Kinburn, at the mouth of the Dnieper river in 1855.

In 1857, the government fitted out Agamemnon to carry 1,250 tons of telegraphic cable for the Atlantic Telegraph Company's first attempt to lay a transatlantic telegraph cable. Although this initial cable attempt was unsuccessful, the project was resumed the following year and Agamemnon and her U.S. counterpart, successfully joined the ends of their two sections of cable in the middle of the Atlantic on 29 July 1858.

Footnotes

Sources 
 Lambert, A. (1984). Battleships in Transition, the Creation of the Steam Battlefleet, 1815–1860. Conway Maritime Press. .
 Parkes, O. (1990). British Battleships. Annapolis: Naval Institute Press. .

External links 
 

1852 ships
Battleships of the Royal Navy
Cable ships of the United Kingdom
Crimean War naval ships of the United Kingdom
Maritime incidents in November 1854
Ships built in Woolwich
Ships of the line of the Royal Navy
Victorian-era battleships of the United Kingdom
Victorian-era ships of the line of the United Kingdom